Xıdırlı or Khydyrly or Khidirly or Chidirly or Khidyrly may refer to:
Xıdırlı, Agdam, Azerbaijan
Xıdırlı, Qubadli, Azerbaijan
Xıdırlı, Salyan, Azerbaijan